is the 27th single by the Japanese female idol group Cute, released in Japan on April 1, 2015. It debuted at number 1 in the daily Oricon singles chart and at number 3 in the weekly Oricon singles chart.

Background 
It is a triple-A-sided single.

Track listing

Limited Edition A, Regular Edition A

Limited Edition B, Regular Edition B

Limited Edition C, Regular Edition C

Charts

References

External links 
 Profile on the Hello! Project official website
 Profile on the Up-Front Works official website

2015 singles
Japanese-language songs
Cute (Japanese idol group) songs
Zetima Records singles
2015 songs
Japanese synth-pop songs
Electronic dance music songs